Pakame Mission is a Methodist-run boarding school in Shurugwi, Zimbabwe which offers classes up to A-level. The mission consists of a primary school and a high school. The school was started by Esau Nemapare, an Ethiopianist clergyman. For a time, it was operated by Thompson Samkange.

References

Sources 
 

Schools in Zimbabwe
Education in Midlands Province